Henri Andrieux (23 September 1931 – 2 January 2008) was a French cyclist. He competed in two events at the 1952 Summer Olympics in Helsinki, Finland. He came in 4th in the team pursuit and 9th in the men's km time trial.

References

1931 births
2008 deaths
French male cyclists
Olympic cyclists of France
Cyclists at the 1952 Summer Olympics
Cyclists from Paris
French track cyclists